HotPads is a map-based rentals and real estate marketplace. Launched in November 2005, the site allows users to search for housing using an interactive map. Listings are displayed at their addresses, allowing users to conduct a location-based search. Through the graphical interface, users click on individual property listings depicted by color-coded building icons.

In 2012, HotPads.com was acquired by Zillow for $16 Million.

In August 2014, HotPads launched an updated version of the site.

Background
HotPads was founded in 2005 by Matt Corgan, Douglas Pope, and John Fitzpatrick. The site currently lists 4 million for-sale properties and 500,000 rental properties, with its most densely listed areas being New York City and Washington DC.

In 2006, based on information from 2006, HotPads operated with a staff of 10 people out of Washington, DC. In 2011, HotPads relocated to San Francisco where it currently operates from the Zillow San Francisco office.

Other features
HotPads includes Zillow's Rent Zestimates (estimated monthly rent price, computed using a proprietary formula), Walk Score's walkability score, and school attendance zones for every listing. HotPads also has a question and answer community called HotPads Answers and an active blog.

References

Tech Journal South: "DC's HotPads pockets $2.3 million A round"
Washington Post: "Start-up"
New York Times: "Mapping Done Right"

External links
HotPads.com
House Styles

Real estate companies of the United States
Web Map Services
2005 establishments in Washington, D.C.
Real estate companies established in 2005
Internet properties established in 2005
Companies based in Washington, D.C.
2005 establishments in the United States
Companies established in 2005